Minkino is a rural locality (a selo) in Kolsky District of Murmansk Oblast, Russia, located beyond the Arctic Circle at a height of  above sea level. Population: 433 (2010 Census).

History
It was in the past also known as the colony of Menkin Ruchey. On December 9, 1920, it became the administrative center of Minkinsky Selsoviet of Alexandrovskaya Volost in Arkhangelsk Governorate of the Russian SFSR. While the selsoviet underwent territorial changes and changed administrative jurisdiction on multiple occasions in the years that followed, Minkino remained its administrative center until 1982.

References

Notes

Sources

Rural localities in Murmansk Oblast
